Multiconfessional countries have a power sharing arrangement between people of different faiths, usually three or more significant confessional groups within the same jurisdiction. Examples of modern countries deemed multiconfessional are Lebanon and Bosnia and Herzegovina. 

The "National Pact" in Lebanon is a formal agreement altering the 1926 Constitution, which laid the foundation of Lebanon as a confessionalist state. Instead of a minority wielding the most power, political power became more representative.

Confessionalism

See also 
Religions by country
Multiculturalism
Religious pluralism

References

Further reading 

Confessionalism
Multiculturalism
Religion and society
Religious pluralism

Political terminology in Lebanon
Political terminology in Bosnia and Herzegovina